The European Tour 2014/2015 – Event 1 (also known as the 2014 Kaspersky Lab Riga Open) was a professional minor-ranking snooker tournament that took place between 7–10 August 2014 at the Arena Riga in Riga, Latvia. This was the first professional snooker tournament held in Latvia.

Mark Selby won his 14th professional title by defeating Mark Allen 4–3 in the final.

Prize fund
The breakdown of prize money of the event is shown below:

Main draw

Preliminary rounds

Round 1
Best of 7 frames

Round 2
Best of 7 frames

Main rounds

Top half

Section 1

Section 2

Section 3

Section 4

Bottom half

Section 5

Section 6

Section 7

Section 8

Finals

Century breaks

 142, 130, 117  Marco Fu
 137, 131, 108  Judd Trump
 137  Ben Woollaston
 134  Stephen Maguire
 134  James Cahill
 131, 102, 102, 100  Mark Selby
 131  Neil Robertson
 130, 120, 112  Alan McManus
 129, 117  Noppon Saengkham
 125  Gary Wilson

 122, 120, 101  Sam Baird
 122, 101  Mark Davis
 114, 106  Ian Glover
 114  Mark Allen
 112  Shaun Murphy
 111, 101  Jimmy Robertson
 107  Michael White
 102  Peter Ebdon
 100  David Gilbert
 100  Jimmy White

References

Riga Masters (snooker)
ET1
2014 in Latvian sport